Portland Radio Authority (PraRadio) was a listener supported pirate radio station originally broadcasting from a mobile, 100-watt transmitter in Portland, Oregon. Listeners and musicians were encouraged to send tracks to the station, with or without a recording contract, and PraRadio would add the music to its mix. The station operated illegally from May 2002 until March 2006, when the U.S. Federal Communications Commission ended the transmissions.

PraRadio continued to broadcast as an Internet radio station until late September 2013. Over 50 volunteer deejays in weekly two-hour shows featured a variety of music and programming.

PraRadio sponsored a series of benefit concerts to raise money for the station, but eventually the costs of operating the station outpaced revenues, and Portland Radio Authority went silent in 2013.

Notes

References

External links
 Portland Radio Authority on Myspace
 PraRadio goodbye note
  Alison Pezanoski-Browne playlist in "Launch of The Neon Vernacular on Portland Radio Authority"

Radio stations established in 2002
Radio stations in Portland, Oregon
2013 disestablishments in Oregon
Defunct radio stations in the United States
2002 establishments in Oregon
Radio stations disestablished in 2013